Male Grahovše is a village in the hills east of Laško in eastern Slovenia. The area is part of the traditional region of Styria. It is now included with the rest of the Municipality of Laško in the Savinja Statistical Region.

References

External links
Male Grahovše on Geopedia

Populated places in the Municipality of Laško